Andonis Fostieris (born 1953) is a Greek poet. He studied Law at the University of Athens and History of Law at Sorbonne, Paris. Since 1981, he is co-editor and director of the literary periodical Η λέξη.

Fostieris is one of the eminent poets of the so-called Generation of the Seventies Genia tou 70, which is a literary term referring to Greek authors who began publishing their work during the 1970s, especially towards the end of the Greek military junta of 1967-1974 and at the first years of the Metapolitefsi. Fostieris has been considerably translated; that includes translation into English by Kimon Friar (1984), the acclaimed translator and scholar for his Modern Greek literature translations.

His poetry
Fostieris' poetic quest is realised in a language marked for its clarity and intimacy. Through a dense poetic language, refined to the degree of perfection, Fostieris seeks to outline a view of life: “The problem of poetic expression has been shifted from the agonising quest for the avant-garde and the old axiom ‘it does not matter what you say, but how you say it’. Without ignoring the manner, the essence, the view of life that the work represents counts more and more.”  Fostieris  builds his structures within each poem and across the collection as a whole. His poetry is multilayered and rich in intertextual references, like in the following excerpt from 'Poetry is Not Made of Ideas':

In any case / Mallarmé excluded it: / Poetry is not made of ideas. / (Good idea. Can it become a poem? Difficult). / Consequently / You are left with the feeling. / You are left with the feeling / Of affliction / Of the eternal triumph / Of feelings.

Selected poetry
Το Μεγάλο Ταξίδι (The Big Trip), 1971
Εσωτερικοί Χώροι ή Τα Είκοσι (Interiors or The Twenty), 1973
Ποίηση μέσα στην ποίηση (Poetry within poetry), 1977
Σκοτεινός έρωτας (Dark Eros), 1977
Ο διάβολος τραγούδησε σωστά (The Devil Sang in Tune), 1981
Το θα και το να του θανάτου (The D and the A of Death), 1987
Η σκέψη ανήκει στο πένθος (Thought Belongs to Mourning), 1996
Πολύτιμη Λήθη (Precious Oblivion), 2003
Ποίηση 1970-2005 (Poetry 1970-2005), 2008
Τοπία του Τίποτα (Landscapes of Nothing), 2013

Translations of his work
 Dark Eros – The Devil Sang in Tune, transl. Kimon Friar, California: Realities Library, 1984, 1986.
 Mørk Eros, transl.. W. G. Pedersen, Arhus: Husets Forlag, Denmark, 1998.
 Djævelen Sang Rent, transl.. W. G. Pedersen, Arhus: Husets Forlag, Denmark, 1998.
 La Pensée Appartient au Deuil, transl.. M. Volkovitch, Paris: Desmos/Cahiers grecs, 1998.
 La Reflexion Pertenece al Luto, transl.. N. Anghelidis - C. Spinedi, Buenos Aires: Edit. Metáfora, 1998.
 Nostalgia del Presente, transl. N. Crocetti, Milano: Crocetti Editore, 2000, 2001.
 Segnali Morse, transl.. M. De Rosa, Milano: En Plein Officina, 2002.
 Prezioso Oblio, transl.. N. Crocetti, Milano: Poesia/195, 2005.
 Mиcao Припада Жалости, transl.. M. Radic, Serbia: Gradinarnik/NKC. Nis, 2008.
 Kамење Драгоценогзаборава, transl.. M. Radic, Serbia: Gradinarnik/NKC. Nis, 2008.
 Precious Oblivion, transl.. T. Nairn - D. Zervanou, Edinburgh: Dionysia Press, 2008.
 Oubli Précieux, transl. C. Mavroeidakos-Muller, Paris: Desmos/Poésie, 2008.
 Sehnsucht nach Gegenwart, transl. Hans and Niki Eideneier, Köln: Romiosini/Poesie griechisch-deutsch, 2013.
 Dichtung in der Dichtung, transl. Hans and Niki Eideneier, Köln: Romiosini/Poesie griechisch-deutsch, 2013.
 Poesia nella Poesia, transl. Nicola Crocetti, Milano: Crocetti Editore, 2013.
 Paesaggi del Nulla, transl. Nicola Crocetti, Milano: Poesia/292, 2014.
 Në sallonin tuaj fëshfërin pylli, transl. Niko Kacalidha, Tirana: Neraida, 2014.

References

External links
His entry for the 2001 Frankfurt Book Fair (Greek)
His page at the website of the Hellenic Authors' Society (Greek)
 

1953 births
Living people
Writers from Athens
National and Kapodistrian University of Athens alumni
University of Paris alumni
Greek male poets
20th-century Greek poets
21st-century Greek poets
20th-century Greek male writers
21st-century Greek male writers
Greek expatriates in France